Bhookambam is a 1983 Indian Malayalam-language film, directed by Joshiy. The film stars Prem Nazir, Jaishankar, Srividya, Mohanlal and Cochin Haneefa. The film has musical score by Shankar–Ganesh.

Cast

Prem Nazir as Mahendran
Jaishankar as Sethu Varman
Srividya as Aswathi
Mohanlal as Raghu
 Shankar as Shankara Panikkar
Raveendran as Pramod
Rajkumar Sethupathi as Vinod
Cochin Haneefa as DSP Anwar
 C. I. Paul as Robert
Kalaranjini as Susie
 Anuradha
Prathapachandran as Ram Chand
Balan K. Nair as Shakthi
Kunchan as Kora
Lalu Alex as Michel
 Pattom Sadan as Eerkili
 Y. Vijaya as Sherley
Swapna as Nisha
 Premanarayanan

Soundtrack
The music was composed by Shankar–Ganesh and the lyrics were written by Bichu Thirumala.

References

External links
 

1983 films
1980s Malayalam-language films
Films scored by Shankar–Ganesh
Films directed by Joshiy